A Tegart fort is a type of militarized police fort constructed throughout Palestine during the British Mandatory period, initiated as a measure against the 1936–1939 Arab Revolt.

Etymology

The forts are named after their designer, British police officer and engineer Sir Charles Tegart.

In Israel, the name is often pronounced "Taggart". This is probably due to the transliteration of the name to Hebrew and then back to Latin alphabet, along with the translator's wrong assumption that the most common way of writing this anglicised Scottish surname has to be applied ("Taggart" is far more widespread than "Tegart").

History

Mandate Palestine
Sir Charles Tegart designed the forts in 1938 based on his experiences in the Indian insurgency. They were built of reinforced concrete with water systems that would allow them to withstand a month-long siege.

Two types of forts were erected. Five structures were built to reinforce the so-called "Tegart's wall" of the northern border with Lebanon and Syria, using a specific design. Dozens more, of a different design to the northern forts and sharing a common basic plan, were built at strategic intersections in the interior of Palestine. The contracts for the construction of the forts was given to the Solel Boneh, the building arm of the Jewish trade union Histadrut.

Israel
Many of them can still be seen in Israel today, and continue to be used as police stations and jails. One houses Camp 1391 prison for "high-risk" prisoners.

The Tegart fort in Ma'alot-Tarshiha, now a police station, is being restored as a historical landmark, attracting the attention of preservationists and tourists.

West Bank
In the West Bank, several such forts, now known as Mukataa ("District") are used as offices and administrative centers of the Palestinian National Authority.

The Ramallah Mukataa, damaged by Israeli forces in the 2002 Operation Defensive Shield and the later siege during the Second Intifada, was later restored and added to under President Mahmoud Abbas, obscuring the lines of the original British structure.

The fort in Hebron was used as the headquarters of the Jordanian administration between 1949 and 1967, of the Israeli military governor between 1967 and 1997, and of the Palestinian Authority's governor between 1997 and 2002. It was destroyed in 2002 when the city was reconquered by Israeli forces in Operation Defensive Shield.

List of Tegart forts in Mandatory Palestine

A progressing list. Not all British Mandate police stations listed below correspond to the definition of a "Tegart fort", although they were all part of the same security building project from 1940-41, with later additions.

British name of the fort, current location name (if it changed), history, current state/use:
Acre police station, now Akko (active)
Affula police station (active)
Al-Khalisa police station, now Kiryat Shmona (active)
Artuf police station, now Beit Shemesh (active)
Atlit police station, now part of an Israeli military prison, Prison Six
Bassa police station, now Ya'ara (military base)
Beersheba police station, now headquarters of the Southern Command
Beisan police station, now Beit She'an (active)
Beit Dajan, now Beit Dagan police station (active)
Bayt Jibrin police station, now Beit Guvrin Border Police base
Khirbet Beit Lid police station, now  Ashmoret maximum security prison at HaSharon or Beit Lid Junction near Ganot Hadar
Beit Shemesh police station (active)
Bethlehem - 2 police stations, one is now the local seat of the Palestinian Authority
Damun police station, now Damon Prison on Mount Carmel
Deir Qaddis police station
Dhahiriya police station
Ein Tina police station in Wadi Amud near Hukok (abandoned). Also Ein at-Tina, Ein-a-Tina, Ein et-Tina.
Fara police station, at Far'a refugee camp near Nablus, now a Palestinian prison
Farradiyya police station, depopulated village near Parod (abandoned)
Gaza police station, bombed in 2008-11, today Al-Saraya park
Gesher police station (abandoned; heritage site near Old Gesher)
Hadera police station (active)
El Hamme police station, now Hamat Gader; destroyed or abandoned (?), in military area on the border.
Hebron police station (destroyed 2001)
Iraq Suweidan police station ("Metzudat Yoav Shenkar" - Yoav Shenkar Fortress), now the Givati Brigade Museum 
Jalame police station, now Kishon Detention Center near Haifa
Jenin police station, now the local seat of the Palestinian Authority
Jericho police station, destroyed by the Palestinian Authority
Jiftlik police station (destroyed? military base?)
Qalqilia police station, destroyed by the Israeli army in 1956 as part of a retaliatory operation
Karkur police station, now Camp 1391 (active)
Kfar Saba police station (active)
Khalsa police station
Khan Yunis police station (destroyed 1955)
Kiryat El Anab police station near Abu Ghosh, served as the initial headquarters of the Givati Brigade and later as a military base; abandoned.
Kiriat Haim police station in Haifa (active)
Latrun police station, now the IDF's Armored Corps Memorial Site and Museum
Lajjun police station near Tel Megiddo, now Megiddo Prison
Lydda police station, now Lod Border Police Headquarters
Majdal police station, now Shikma Prison at Ashkelon (maximum security prison)
Majd al-Krum police station (restaurant)
Metulla police station
Nabi Salih police station, now the Halamish (Neveh Tzuf) day care center and girls high school
Nabi Yusha police station, now the Metzudat Koach Memorial and museum of the 1948 battle
Nablus - 3 police stations
Nahalal police station, now the Center for Commemorating the Jewish Supernumerary Police
Nazareth police station
Ness Ziona police station. Later used as a military base, closed down in 2006.
Petah Tiqvah police station (active)
El Qatra police station at Gedera (abandoned)
Rafah police station
Ramallah police station, largely destroyed during the Second Intifada, now part of the "Mukataa" presidential HQ of the Palestinian Authority
Ramat Gan police station (active)
Ramleh - two police stations:
one still active police station
Ayalon Prison (maximum security prison) in Ramla
Rehovot police station (active)
Rosh Pinna police station
Salha fort, built in 1938
Safad - 2 police stations:
inner-city municipal police station
Safed, the Mount Canaan police station (in ruins)
Samakh, the British border guard base (Tsemah Junction near Tiberias), now abandoned
Sarafand El Kharab police station
Sa'sa' police post, 4km west of Sa'sa', now military base adjacent to Mattat
Shafa Amr police station, now Givat Hamishtara near Shfaram: police museum, but closed to the public (as of 2011)
Shefer (abandoned; former Farradiyya police fort) 
Shatta police station, now within Shata maximum security prison ( along former Jezreel Valley railway)
Sukat as-Sufi police station. Also Suqat as-Sufi, Shoket es Sufi. Was on the Egyptian border about 6-7km SE of Rafah, at 0791/0741, now in the Gaza Strip.
Tarshiha police station (active; is being restored as heritage site)
Tani (?) police station, now Be'er Tuvia (abandoned)
Tarbikha police post, now Shomera (part of military base)
Tel Mond police station, now HaSharon Prison (at Hadarim Interchange)
Tiberias police station (active)
Tulkarm police station
Yatta police station
Yavne police station
Zichron Ya'aqov police station (active)

See also
 Shlomo Gur
 Tower and stockade
 Boma (enclosure)

References

Forts in Israel
History of Mandatory Palestine

Forts in the State of Palestine